Kamaing (also Kamine) is a jade-mining town in the Kachin State of the northernmost part of the Republic of the Union of Myanmar. It is the birthplace of journalist Edward Michael Law-Yone.

External links
Satellite map at Maplandia.com

Populated places in Kachin State